Superannuation Act is a stock short title used in New Zealand and the United Kingdom for legislation relating to superannuation.

List

New Zealand
The Superannuation Act 1947 (No 57)

United Kingdom
The Superannuation Act 2010 (c 37) 
The Superannuation Act 1972 (c 11) 
The Superannuation (Miscellaneous Provisions) Act 1967 (c 28) 
The Superannuation Act 1965 (c 74)
The Superannuation (Amendment) Act 1965 (c 10)
The Superannuation Act 1957 (5 & 6 Eliz 2 c 37)
The Superannuation Act 1950 (14 & 15 Geo 6 c 2)
The Superannuation Act 1949 (12, 13 & 14 Geo 6 c 44)
The Superannuation (Miscellaneous Provisions) Act 1948 (11 & 12 Geo 6 c 33)
The Superannuation Act 1946 (9 & 10 Geo 6 c 60)
The Superannuation Schemes (War Service) Act 1940 (3 & 4 Geo 6 c 26) 
The Superannuation (Various Services) Act 1938 (1 & 2 Geo 6 c 13)
The Superannuation Act 1935 (25 & 26 Geo 5 c 23)
The Superannuation (Diplomatic Service) Act 1929 (19 Geo 5 c 11)
The Superannuation and other Trust Funds (Validation) Act 1927 (17 & 18 Geo 5 c 41)
The Superannuation Act 1914 (4 & 5 Geo 5 c 86)
The Superannuation Act 1909 (9 Edw 7 c 10)
The Overseas Superannuation Act 1991 (c 16)  
The British Council and Commonwealth Institute Superannuation Act 1986 (c 51)
The Local Government Superannuation Act 1953 (1 & 2 Eliz 2 c 25)
The Local Government Superannuation Act 1939 (2 & 3 Geo 6 c 18)
The Local Government Superannuation (Scotland) Act 1937 (1 Edw 8 & 1 Geo 6 c 69)
The Local Government Superannuation Act 1937 (1 Edw 8 & 1 Geo 6 c 68)
The Teachers Superannuation (Scotland) Act 1968 (c 12)
The Teachers' Superannuation Act 1967 (c 12)
The Teachers (Superannuation) Act 1956 (c 53)
The Education (Scotland) (War Service Superannuation) Act 1939 (c 96)
The Metropolitan Police (Staff Superannuation and Police Fund) Act 1931 (c 12)
The Superannuation (Miscellaneous Provisions) Act (Northern Ireland) 1969 (c 7) (NI)
The Superannuation Act (Northern Ireland) 1967 (c 24) (NI)
The Superannuation (Amendment) Act (Northern Ireland) 1966 (c 27) (NI)
The Superannuation (Miscellaneous Provisions) Act (Northern Ireland) 1951 (c 28) (NI)
The Local Government (Superannuation) Act (Northern Ireland) 1950 (c 10) (NI)
The Superannuation Schemes (War Service) Act (Northern Ireland) 1941 (c 6) (NI)
The Superannuation and Other Trust Funds (Validation) Act (Northern Ireland) 1928 (c 6) (NI)

The Superannuation Acts 1834 to 1892 was the collective title of the following Acts:
The Superannuation Act 1834 (4 & 5 Will 4 c 24)
The Superannuation Act 1859 (22 Vict c 26)
The Superannuation Act 1860 (23 & 24 Vict c 89)
The Superannuation Act 1866 (29 & 30 Vict c 68)
The Superannuation Act 1876 (39 & 40 Vict c 53)
The Superannuation Act 1881 (44 & 45 Vict c 43)
The Superannuation Act 1884 (47 & 48 Vict c 57)
The Superannuation Act 1887 (50 & 51 Vict c 67)
The Superannuation Act 1892 (55 & 56 Vict c 40)

See also
List of short titles

References

Lists of legislation by short title